The Feiro Dongó (in English, Feiro Bumblebee) was a Hungarian side-by-side trainer biplane. It was notable for its high aspect ratio wings, aerodynamic clearness and high lift/drag ratio.

Design
The Feiro Dongó was the second design of Lajos Rotter in his collaboration with the brothers Gyula and László Feigl. Rotter aimed to produce a training aircraft of high aerodynamic refinement with a high lift to drag ratio (L/D) which was also stable but responsive to the controls, structurally strong, easy to land and with a good all-round view from the cockpit. An innovative wing design was a key feature.   The Dongó was a biplane with wings of very high aspect ratio and modified elliptical plan, thus minimising induced drag. The upper wing had an aspect ratio of 16.9, very high at the time, and both wings had a root chord of only , though the lower was  shorter. Both had thick airfoils.  The very narrow wings were claimed to provide longitudinal stability, as the centre of pressure could not move far, and further pitch stability was provided by heavy stagger, with the lower wing  behind the upper. The two wings were set at different angles of attack, 0° on the lower and 2° on the upper, again with the intention of improving longitudinal stability  To provide roll stability the upper wing had dihedral beyond a short centre section. The latter was supported by a steel tube cabane which had pairs of vertical, kinked struts, faired in the upper part, and a forward, transverse inverted-V, all joined to the upper fuselage. This structure made it possible to vary the upper wing's angle of incidence and the stagger.  The wings were 3-ply covered, two spar structures.  High aspect ratio, metal covered ailerons were mounted on the lower wings.

The Dongó's wings were simply braced compared with most biplanes of the day, with an arrangement made possible by the narrow chord and large stagger. A single, vertical, faired interplane strut on each side braced the rear spar of the upper wing to the lower forward spar. Towards its top a metal faired-in oblique strut braced the forward, upper spar and there was a similar arrangement at its foot to the rear spar. To minimise drag, there were no conventional cross bracing flying wires but instead a single, faired diagonal strut from the top of each interplane struts to the corresponding lower fuselage longeron.

The Dongó's rectangular section fuselage was built around four longerons, with bottom and sides covered with plywood. The rounded upper decking was light metal. This was placed over the lower wings but aft of the upper trailing edge, providing an excellent view both upwards and downwards. The Dongó could be fitted with dual control or flown with one set removed. The steel framed cabane under the upper wing was intended to give the occupants protection in the case of an overturning. It was powered by a  Oberursel U.I nine cylinder rotary engine, mounted in the nose on steel bearings behind a firewall. At the rear the empennage was conventional, with a very upright fin and deep, rounded rudder. The horizontal tail, mounted on top of the fuselage, had straight, swept leading edges and a semi-elliptical trailing edge form with separate elevators. All rear surfaces had relatively high aspect ratios, again to minimize drag. The Dongó had a fixed tailskid undercarriage, with mainwheels on half-axles hinged centrally from a transverse inverted-V strut and mounted just inside the wheels on two inverted V longitudinal struts.

Operational history

The date of the Dongó's first flight, made sometime during 1924, is not known exactly but by mid-December 1924 it had completed its tests in front of the official commission. It is not known if the Dongó ever received the intended lower powered engine, if the narrow wings met their design rigidity targets or if the "exceptionally good" maximum lift/drag ratio of about 16, remarkable for a fixed undercarriage biplane, was achieved. Despite its aerodynamic refinement it did not go into production and only one was built.  Rotter's interest in high lift/drag designs later led him to gliders; his first design, the 1933 Karakan, had an aspect ratio of 19, only a little greater than that of the Dongó though a much greater structural challenge for a monoplane wing without the biplane's intrinsic braced girder strength. Flying it, Rotter became Hungary's first "Silver C" glider pilot.

Specifications (test engine)

References

1920s Hungarian aircraft